Gerfalco is a village in Tuscany, central Italy, administratively a frazione of the comune of Montieri, province of Grosseto, in the area of Colline Metallifere. At the time of the 2001 census its population amounted to 78.

Geography 
Gerfalco is about 70 km from Grosseto and 7 km from Montieri, and it is situated in the Cornate e Fosini Natural Reserve.

Main sights 

 San Biagio, main parish church of the village, it was consecrated in 1599.
 Sant'Agostino (14th century), it was an ancient convent of the Augustinians.
 Church of Misericordia (13th century), it was restructured in the 18th century.
 Walls of Gerfalco, old fortifications which surround the village since the 12th century.

References

Bibliography 
 Aldo Mazzolai, Guida della Maremma. Percorsi tra arte e natura, Le Lettere, Florence, 1997.

See also 
 Boccheggiano
 Montieri
 Travale

Frazioni of Montieri